First Air Flight 6560 was a domestic charter flight that crashed on landing at Resolute, Nunavut, Canada, on 20 August 2011. Of the 15 people on board, 12 were killed and the remaining three were severely injured. The Boeing 737-200 of First Air was operating a service from Yellowknife, Northwest Territories, when it struck a hill in cloud near Resolute Bay Airport.

The subsequent investigation found that a late initiation of the descent, the inadvertent partial disengagement of the autopilot during final approach, a drift in the aircraft compass system and poor communication between the flight crew resulted in the aircraft drifting significantly off course from the final approach path, descending into the ground moments after the crew initiated a go-around.

History of the flight
Flight 6560 had departed from Yellowknife Airport at 09:40 CDT (14:40 UTC) on 20 August for a flight to Resolute Bay Airport carrying 11 passengers, 4 crew members and freight. Captain Blair Rutherford was designated as pilot flying for the segment, and First Officer David Hare as the pilot monitoring. The flight was to be conducted in accordance with instrument flight rules. Reports received shortly after take-off indicated deteriorating weather at Resolute, but the crew agreed that the flight should not divert.

While descending in cloud, however, instead of following the localizer signal along the runway's track, the aircraft settled on a track roughly parallel and to the east of the runway centreline.

An intense post-crash fire consumed most of the centre section.

Both pilots, two flight attendants and eight passengers were killed in the impact. Three passengers survived with severe injuries. Rescue operations were carried out by Canadian Forces temporarily stationed at Resolute as part of the 2011 Operation Nanook military exercise, which happened to focus on a major air disaster as main training scenario.

Aircraft

The aircraft involved was a combi (or combined passenger-cargo) Boeing 737-210C with registration C-GNWN. It was manufactured in 1975 with serial number 21067/414.

C-GNWN was fitted with a gravel kit to enable operations from unpaved runways, such as the one at Resolute Bay Airport. No significant problems with the aircraft maintenance records were found during the investigation.

Investigation
The accident was investigated by the Transportation Safety Board of Canada (TSB). In January 2012, the TSB issued an investigation update classifying the accident as a controlled flight into terrain (CFIT). It stated that the go-around manoeuvre was initiated two seconds before impact.

Both engines were in operation and producing power. The aircraft had been following an instrument landing system (ILS) approach due to poor visibility. Post-crash investigation found the airport's ILS system to be operating normally, and was in fact used by another aircraft that successfully landed 20 minutes after the crash of Flight 6560.

In March 2014, the TSB issued the final accident report. It found that the crew's decision to initiate the descent from cruise altitude was late, and it resulted in a significantly increased workload that affected the crew's subsequent performance and ability to properly track all parameters.

The approach was entirely flown on autopilot, which was correctly set to capture the localizer signal and track along the runway centreline (VOR/LOC capture mode). However, an inadvertent movement of the control column by the captain during the turn onto the final approach track caused the autopilot to disengage from VOR/LOC mode and revert to maintaining the current heading, resulting in the aircraft rolling out to the right (east) of the runway centreline.

The deviation was correctly shown on the onboard localizer indicator. However, for undetermined reasons, the compass system had been incorrectly set during initial descent so that it displayed a heading that was 8° to the left of the actual heading. Furthermore, the pilot did not recalibrate the compass after the initial descent, 15 minutes before the crash, though regular recalibration when so near the North Magnetic Pole is necessary; the magnetic influence further increased the initial mis-calibration to 17°, giving the captain the wrong impression that the aircraft was tracking towards regaining the runway centreline.

In fact the aircraft was flying roughly parallel to the runway, and a wind from the southwest was pushing it even further to the east. Under a significantly increased workload, neither pilot noticed the partial disengagement of the autopilot. The first officer was aware that the aircraft was off course to the right and heading for the hill east of the airport. He tried to warn the captain 18 times, using multiple different variations of phrasing, but failed to find a way to convey the urgency of the situation and make the captain change his course of action. After the ground proximity warning system (GPWS) issued a 'sink rate' warning, the captain finally commanded a go-around, but there was insufficient distance from terrain to avoid the collision.

The TSB highlighted how according to First Air's own standard operation procedures, the approach was clearly unstable and should have been aborted at an early stage. The board stressed the risks posed by unstable approaches that are continued to a landing, and called for airlines and authorities to enforce standard operating procedures and crew resource management best practices, to help crews manage workload and communicate effectively in order to make better decisions.

Dramatization
The crash of First Air Flight 6560 was dramatized in "Death in the Arctic", a season 14 (2015) episode of the internationally syndicated Canadian TV documentary series Mayday.

References

External links
First Air press release (Archive) – 22 August 2011
First Air mourns loss of crew (Archive) – 23 August 2011.
TSB investigation timeline
TSB Debris photos
 TSB final report (PDF version)
 TSB final report (PDF version) (in French)

Accidents and incidents involving the Boeing 737 Original
Aviation accidents and incidents in 2011
Airliner accidents and incidents in Canada
Airliner accidents and incidents involving controlled flight into terrain
Disasters in Nunavut
2011 disasters in Canada
2011 in Nunavut
August 2011 events in Canada